Paul Ragnvald Paulson (1858–1926) was a Norwegian book publisher and politician for the Labour Party.

Biography
He hailed from Bergen. He was the son of  politician  Olav Paulssøn (1822–1896) and Anna Kristine Christofa Hagerup (1824–1917) and was an older brother of Andreas Paulson. The family had moved to Bergen from Jølster in 1860, as the father was offered a job there.

He started an antiquarian bookshop in Bergen in 1884, and later expanded with a publishing house. The publishing house perished in the Bergen fire of 1916. Paulson also translated socialist literature, including Peter Kropotkin, Robert Blatchford and other Fabians. He was a member of Bergen city council, and had influence in the nationwide party around 1905–1906. He died in late 1926.

References

1858 births
1926 deaths
Norwegian booksellers
Norwegian book publishers (people)
Norwegian translators
Labour Party (Norway) politicians
Politicians from Bergen